Beckianum is a genus of air-breathing land snails, terrestrial pulmonate gastropod mollusks. This genus in the family Achatinidae.

Species
Species within the genus Beckianum include:
 Beckianum beckianum (Pfeiffer, 1846)
 Beckianum sinistrum Martens, 1890
 Beckianum sp. - besides Beckianum beckianum and Beckianum sinistrum there seems to exist another species, endemic to Nicaragua

References

Subulininae
Taxonomy articles created by Polbot